Marabel Morgan (born 25 June 1937) is an American author of self-help books for married women, including The Total Woman (1973), Total Joy (1983), The Total Woman Cookbook (1976) and The Electric Woman (1986).

Early life
Morgan's mother remarried, and Morgan had a good relationship with her stepfather until he died when she was 14.

Relationship principles, and writing career
After reading widely, Morgan developed some relationship principles. In 1973 she published The Total Woman. The book sold more than 10 million copies and was the bestselling nonfiction book of 1974. Grounded in evangelical Christianity, it taught that "It's only when a woman surrenders her life to her husband, reveres and worships him and is willing to serve him, that she becomes really beautiful to him," and that "A Total Woman caters to her man's special quirks, whether it be in salads, sex or sports." It is perhaps best remembered for suggesting that wives greet their man at the front door wearing sexy outfits; suggestions included "a cowgirl or a showgirl."

These lessons were reiterated in Morgan's popular Total Woman Seminars. Due in part to her sunny disposition and facility with soundbites, Morgan became an unofficial spokesperson for opposition to the women's movement. She was a regular guest on The Phil Donahue Show, was featured on the cover of Time Magazine, and was named one of the most influential women in America by People magazine and the 1975 World Almanac.

In popular culture
An episode of the popular sitcom Maude entitled "Feminine Fulfillment" (28 February 1977) dealt with main character Maude Findlay's best friend Vivian Harmon giving herself over to "Feminine Fulfillment" (also the name of the episode), which Maude says is "like Total Woman." Vivian, expecting her husband Arthur, shocks Maude and her husband Walter by opening her door to them in a trench coat, revealing herself to be wrapped in saran wrap. "Total Woman" is again referenced later in the episode, when more aspects of the movement are elucidated. Maude, a staunch feminist, is incensed by her friend's change, and confronts what she believes is her husband's growing interest in being pampered in this manner by seemingly also dressing in saran wrap under a trench coat and greeting a male neighbour who knocks on the Findlays' door.
In an episode of James Garner's NBC-TV series The Rockford Files entitled "Trouble in Chapter 17" (23 September 1977), the character of Anne Louise Clement (Claudette Nevins), who believes her book on how to be the perfect wife is the cause of the death threats against her and for whom Jim must act as bodyguard, is closely based on Marabel Morgan.
A 1978 episode of Rhoda also dealt with the topic. Although the book carries a different title in the episode ("How to Be a Different Woman in Every Room"), the episode is entitled "The Total Brenda." In it, Rhoda's sister Brenda takes to wearing frilly dresses and fulfilling her fiancé's perceived fantasies on a variety of levels, much to the chagrin of liberated Rhoda.
In the 1991 film Fried Green Tomatoes, the character played by Kathy Bates attempts to seduce her husband by wrapping herself in saran wrap; a takeoff on some of the suggestions in the book:  "Be a pixie or a pirate -- a cowgirl or a showgirl."
In a 2000 episode ("Rory's Dance") of Gilmore Girls, Lorelai (played by Lauren Graham) jokingly tells her mother (Kelly Bishop) that she would have come to the door to let her in, but she didn't have any saran wrap.

Morgan and The Total Woman were satirized in the Earwolf podcast The Complete Woman, which takes the format of a self-help audiobook from the 1960s with actress Amanda Lund portraying the fictional hostess Marabel May as a parody of Morgan. The Complete Woman was followed by two sequels, Complete Joy and The Complete Man.

Personal life

Marabel Morgan has 2 grown daughters.

After her book-writing, Morgan worked in the health industry.
 
Morgan was diagnosed with thyroid cancer in 1987.
 
Her husband Charlie worked as a tax lawyer and sports player representative. As of 2017 they appear to continue happily married.

Bibliography

Morgan, Marabel. The Total Woman. Old Tappan, N.J.: F. H. Revell, 1973.

References

External links
Ohio History Central
1977 Time profile
The Rockford Files at IMDB
Interview
Interview

1937 births
People from Crestline, Ohio
Living people
Female critics of feminism
20th-century American women writers
20th-century American writers
21st-century American women